Gayton is a surname, and may refer to:

 Albert Gayton (1840–1923), Canadian merchant and politician
 Clark Gayton, American musician
 Clark Gayton  (1712–1785), British Royal Navy Officer
 Tony Gayton, American film producer and screenwriter